Guadagna is a neighborhood within Palermo in the northern portion of Sicily.

Zones of Palermo